Pseudojaniridae is a family of crustaceans belonging to the order Isopoda.

Genera:
 Adajinoperus Serov & Wilson, 1999
 Pseudojanira Barnard, 1925
 Schottea Serov & Wilson, 1999

References

Isopoda